Sebastian Blomberg (born 24 May 1972) is a German actor. He has appeared in more than forty films since 1997.

In 2008 he played Rudi Dutschke in The Baader Meinhof Complex (German: Der Baader Meinhof Komplex). Dutschke was the most prominent student leader of the German Student Movement that took place in the late 60's.

Selected filmography

References

External links 

1972 births
Living people
People from Bergisch Gladbach
Actors from North Rhine-Westphalia
German male film actors